John Cary was the member of the Parliament of England for Salisbury for the parliament of September 1397.

References 

Members of Parliament for Salisbury
English MPs September 1397
14th-century English politicians
Year of birth unknown
Year of death unknown